Koothu-P-Pattarai is a prominent Tamil theatre group that has organised plays for 31 years. The group has its base in Chennai, Tamil Nadu in South India. It conducts speech training in a theatre speech laboratory and conducts workshops teaching "elements of traditional theatre art forms" as well as presenting lectures in educational institutions in order to raise awareness about folk theatre's significance to modern theatre.

The style of theatre has been described in The Hindu newspaper as "an intense physicality coupled with powerful ideas", and was described by India9.com as being "native folk arts in a contemporary style".

The director for this group, Na Muthuswamy, was the recipient of the Sangeet Natak Akademi Award from the Government of India.

References

External links
Koothu-P-Pattarai official web site.

Theatre companies in India
Organisations based in Chennai
Tamil theatre
1989 establishments in Tamil Nadu
Arts organizations established in 1989